Jensen Beach is an unincorporated community and census-designated place (CDP) in Martin County, Florida, United States. The population was 12,652 at the 2020 census. It is part of the Port St. Lucie, Florida Metropolitan Statistical Area.

History
The history of Jensen Beach in the 19th century revolved around pineapple farming. John Laurence Jensen, an immigrant from Denmark, arrived in 1881, and set up his pineapple plantation, which became the town of Jensen.

By 1894, the Florida East Coast Railway reached Jensen Beach, and freight shipments were loaded directly onto the freight cars.

By 1895, Jensen was called the "Pineapple Capital of the World", shipping over one million boxes of pineapples each year during the June and July season. To help handle the increased pineapple production, a pineapple factory was built, but a hard freeze in 1895 devastated most of the small pineapple plantations. Two fires, in 1908 and 1910, destroyed most of Jensen Beach and its remaining pineapple farms. The industry finally collapsed in 1920 due to a wide variety of financial and agriculture problems. Growers decided to turn their efforts in another direction: raising citrus fruits. The pineapple has become a symbol of Jensen Beach. The fruit legacy is celebrated annually during the Jensen Beach Pineapple Festival.

Jensen Beach was incorporated as "Jensen" in 1926 during the Florida Land Boom, but was dissolved seven years later by the State of Florida in 1933 following the onset of the Great Depression. The town's name was officially changed to "Jensen Beach" by Martin County in 1943.

In the second half of the 1900s, Saint Joseph College of Florida and later the Florida Institute of Technology both located on the Mansion at Tuckahoe premises in Jensen Beach.

In 2004 Jensen Beach was hit by two hurricanes.

Geography and climate

Jensen Beach occupies the northeast corner of Martin County. It is bordered to the east by the Indian River Lagoon and the town of Ocean Breeze, to the southeast by the town of Sewall's Point, to the south by unincorporated Rio, to the southwest by the city of Stuart, the Martin county seat, to the northwest by U.S. Route 1, and to the north by the city of Port St. Lucie in St. Lucie County. Unincorporated North River Shores is to the west of Jensen Beach, on the opposite side of US 1.

Waveland was the original name for the area from Crossroads Hill (south of N.E. Center Street) south to the tip of Sewall's Point and west to Warner Creek.

"Jensen" originally meant the area immediately adjacent to modern-day downtown Jensen Beach.

Jensen Beach was rated the "Top Spot for Beach Volleyball" in 2008 by Prime Time Magazine, and is a part of Florida's Treasure Coast region, which derives its name from the ships that wrecked during the 17th century because of coral reefs in the shallow waters. Artifacts and treasures from these ships of Spanish origin can still be discovered today.

The climate in the area is characterized by hot, humid summers and generally mild to cool winters.  According to the Köppen Climate Classification system, Jensen Beach has a humid subtropical climate, abbreviated "Cfa" on climate maps.

Government
Jensen Beach is an unincorporated town in Martin County. Jensen Beach is currently represented by Doug Smith as part of Martin County District 1.

The Jensen Beach Neighborhood Advisory Committee is composed of appointed Jensen Beach residents and business owners and formally advises the Martin County Community Redevelopment Agency regarding planning matters in the area.

Demographics

2020 census

As of the 2020 United States census, there were 12,652 people, 5,934 households, and 3,038 families residing in the CDP.

2000 census
As of the census of 2000, there were 11,100 people, 5,059 households, and 3,025 families residing in the CDP. The racial makeup of the CDP was 95.80% White, 2.25% African American, 0.22% Native American, 0.47% Asian, 0.04% Pacific Islander, 0.37% from other races, and 0.86% from two or more races. Hispanic or Latino of any race were 2.77% of the population.

There were 5,059 households, out of which 23.8% had children under the age of 18 living with them, 47.2% were married couples living together, 8.8% had a female householder with no husband present, and 40.2% were non-families. 33.2% of all households were made up of individuals, and 17.6% had someone living alone who was 65 years of age or older.  The average household size was 2.19 and the average family size was 2.78.

20.0% of the population was under the age of 18, 5.4% from 18 to 24, 25.4% from 25 to 44, 25.3% from 45 to 64, and 23.8% were 65 or older.  The median age was 44 years. For every 100 females, there were 94.2 males.  For every 100 females age 18 and over, there were 89.7 males.

The median income for a household in the CDP was $36,674, and the median income for a family was $49,787. Males had a median income of $34,368 versus $25,118 for females. The per capita income for the CDP was $22,921. 8.3% of the population and 5.0% of families were below the poverty line. 8.4% of those under the age of 18 and 7.4% of those 65 and older were living below the poverty line.

Recreation
The main public beach in Jensen Beach is on Hutchinson Island and is called Jensen Sea Turtle Beach. It is a wide sandy beach on the Atlantic Ocean. Martin County life guards are in attendance. The beach is used for sun bathing, surfing, fishing and swimming.

Ecology
Jensen Beach is known in the marine biology community for being a location for sea turtles to nest.

Designated sections of the Jensen Sea Turtle Beach are barricaded off in order to protect the nests of the sea turtles. The three species found on this beach are the loggerhead, leatherback turtle and green sea turtle. Loggerhead nests are the most common type found on this and adjacent beaches. Locations of the sea turtles' nests are marked with the approximate date in which the eggs were laid and the expected date in which the eggs will hatch. These notifications are meant to discourage tourists and residents from visiting the beach in the evening hours during these time periods. Efforts are made to protect both species of sea turtles since nests have been declining in recent years due to the severe erosion of the beach.

Economics

Downtown Jensen Beach is the site of the annual Pineapple Festival.

Education
Jensen Beach High School
Jensen Beach Elementary
Felix A. Williams Elementary
The Environmental Studies Center
Stuart Middle School

Media
As of September 10, 2010, Jensen Beach once again has its own newspaper, the free Pineapple Post.

Historic landmarks
Historic landmarks in Jensen Beach include:
 All Saints Episcopal Church erected in 1898 is the oldest church building in Jensen Beach as well as in Martin County. Adjacent to the church is All Saints Cemetery which is non-sectarian and serves the whole community.
 Capt. John Miller House (private) on Indian River Drive in Eden, built by an early settler in the late 1890s
 Jensen Beach Christian Church built in 1910-1912
 Capt. Henry E. Sewall House, now located in Indian RiverSide Park
 The Mansion at Tuckahoe in IndianRiverside Park
 Mount Elizabeth Archeological Site in IndianRiverside Park
 Stuart Welcome Arch, on County Road 707

Sister cities
Jensen Beach has been the sister city of Gregory Town in the Bahamas since July 1989.

Notable people
 Ralph Evinrude, CEO of Outboard Motor Company with a test facility in Stuart; married Frances Langford and retired to Jensen Beach
Derek Fathauer, PGA golfer
Forest K. Ferguson, World War II recipient of Distinguished Service Cross
Frances Langford, singer and entertainer
Bobby Lord, country singer
Anthony Newley, British songwriter and actor
Scott Proctor, baseball pitcher
Jennifer Sky (born Jennifer Kathleen Wacha), actress

References

 
Census-designated places in Martin County, Florida
Port St. Lucie metropolitan area
Populated coastal places in Florida on the Atlantic Ocean
Beaches of Martin County, Florida
Census-designated places in Florida
Beaches of Florida